Kigwancha Sports Club or Kigwancha Sports Team, known as Sinuiju Locomotive Sports Club is a North Korean multi-sports club belonging to the Korean State Railway and based in Sinuiju. It was established on 11 January 1956, and has been awarded the Order of Kim Il-sung and the Order of the National Flag (First Class). The club is best known for its men's and women's football teams.

Kigwancha's men presently play in the DPR Korea Premier Football League, and won several championships in the late 1990s. The club finished third in 2006 season. They have taken part in continental competition once, finishing second in its group in the group stage of the 2017 AFC Cup.

Current squad

Known players (including former players)

 Li Chan-myung
 Pak Chol-ryong
 Pak Kwang-ryong

Managers
 Ku Jong-nam (before 2014)
 Han Won-chol (since 2014)

Continental history

Achievements
DPR Korea League: 9
 1996, 1997, 1998, 1999, 2000, 2016
 1995, 2006, 2012

Hwaebul Cup: 2
 2015
4th 2017

Man'gyŏngdae Prize: 5
 2004, 2005
 2015, 2016
 2014

Paektusan Prize: 1
 2012

Poch'ŏnbo Torch Prize: 3
 2007
 2010, 2016

Other Sports
The club also has basketball and volleyball teams. Athletes representing the club also play tennis.

References

External links
 

Railway sports teams
Association football clubs established in 1956
Football clubs in North Korea
1956 establishments in North Korea
Multi-sport clubs in North Korea
Football clubs in Pyongyang
Railway association football teams in North Korea